Antwan Peek (born October 29, 1979) is a former American football linebacker. He was drafted by the Houston Texans in the third round of the 2003 NFL Draft. He played college football at Cincinnati.

Peek has also played for the Cleveland Browns.

Early years
Peek is a 1998 graduate of Woodward High School in Cincinnati, Ohio, and was a letterwinner in football, basketball, and track & field. In football and basketball, he was named the Team's Most Valuable Player as a senior.

College career
Peek played college football at the University of Cincinnati. He set a school record with 27.5 sacks and finished his career with 200 tackles. He majored in criminal justice.

Professional career

Houston Texans
Peek was selected by the Houston Texans in the third round (67th overall) in the 2003 NFL Draft. In his rookie season, he played in ten games and made 28 tackles. He made his NFL debut at the Miami Dolphins on September 7. In his second season with the Texans, he played in 14 games and finished the season with 12 tackles and two sacks. In the game against the Jacksonville Jaguars on December 26, he returned a fumble 66 yards for his first NFL career touchdown. In 2005, Peek started in every game for the first time in his career. He finished the season with 57 tackles and his career-high six sacks was the second highest on the team. The start of the 2006 season was frustrating for Peek as he missed the first five games with an injury. However, he appeared in the final 11 games and finished the season with 13 tackles.

Cleveland Browns
Peek was signed by the Cleveland Browns as an unrestricted free agent on March 3, 2007. He made his Browns debut versus the Pittsburgh Steelers on September 9. He made 14 appearances with five starts and finished the season with 24 tackles.

On February 9, 2009, Peek was released by the Browns.

References

External links
Cleveland Browns bio

1979 births
Living people
Players of American football from Cincinnati
American football linebackers
Cincinnati Bearcats football players
Houston Texans players
Cleveland Browns players
Woodward High School (Cincinnati, Ohio) alumni